Fazal Rahim Marwat (born 12 June 1959), is a renowned educator, writer, researcher, historian and former vice-chancellor of Bacha Khan University, Charsadda, Pakistan.

Education 
Fazal Rahim Marwat got his Ph.D. in 1992, M. Phil in 1982 and Political Science in 1979 from the University of Peshawar and B.A in 1976 from Gomal University Dera Ismail Khan.

Literary work 
 
 
 
 
 [ The Basmachi Movement in Soviet Central Asia: A Study in Political Development]
 [ Afghanistan and the Frontier]
 Tarikhi-Junbash-i-Islami-Wa-Mili-Muslmanan-Asia-Miana-DarMuqabil-i-Communism-i-Russ. (Dari)
 [ The Evolution and Growth of Communism in Afghanistan (1917-79): An Appraisal]
 Taaruf (Urdu)
 The impact of the great game on the Pashtuns/Afghans

References 

1959 births
Living people
University of Peshawar alumni
Academic staff of the University of Peshawar
Vice-Chancellors of universities in Pakistan
Gomal University alumni
21st-century Pakistani historians